"Everybody Hurts" is a song by American rock band R.E.M. from their eighth studio album, Automatic for the People (1992), and released as a single in April 1993. It peaked at number 29 on the US Billboard Hot 100. The song fared much better on the US Cash Box Top 100, where it peaked at number 18. It also reached the top 10 on the charts of Australia, Canada, France, Iceland, Ireland, the Netherlands, and the United Kingdom. In 2003, Q ranked "Everybody Hurts" at number 31 on their list of the "1001 Best Songs Ever". In 2005, Blender ranked the song at number 238 on their list of "Greatest Songs Since You Were Born".

Background
Much of the song was written by drummer Bill Berry, although as R.E.M. share songwriting credits among its members, it is unknown how much he actually wrote. Berry's drums are largely absent from the song—a Univox drum machine took his place—but he was responsible for the sampling of the drum pattern on the track. The string arrangement was written by Led Zeppelin bassist John Paul Jones.

Guitarist Peter Buck commented on the making of the track, saying:

In the liner notes of the album In Time: The Best of R.E.M. 1988–2003, Buck wrote that "the reason the lyrics are so atypically straightforward is because it was aimed at teenagers", and "I've never watched Buffy the Vampire Slayer, but the idea that high school is a portal to hell seems pretty realistic to me." The song was used in the 1992 film Buffy the Vampire Slayer that preceded the show.

In 2005, Buck told the BBC: "If you're consciously writing for someone who hasn't been to college, or is pretty young, it might be nice to be very direct. In that regard, it's tended to work for people of a lot of ages." In 2022, Stipe told Rick Rubin that "Everybody Hurts" was inspired by Nazareth's cover of "Love Hurts".

Michael Stipe had originally intended for Patti Smith to be a second vocal on the track, but it did not work out. Smith later included her own cover of the song as a bonus track on the 2007 album Twelve.

Critical reception

The song received favorable reviews from most music critics. AllMusic editor Stephen Thomas Erlewine found that it has "a comforting melancholy". David Bauder from The Associated Press said that it keeps "the pace slow and the mood melancholy." Larry Flick from Billboard called it a "spare, honest, and emotional track", adding "when the strings kick in, there's no denying this song's power." Bevan Hannah from The Canberra Times noted "the smoothly caressing guitar". Another editor, Larry McShane described it as "haunting". Randy Clark from Cashbox named it the "strongest" cut of the album. Another editor, Troy J. Augusto, felt it "might be a hard sell at radio, given the somber mood and suicide related theme". He complimented the singer's "silky vocals and the song's lush string section [that] provide this track's main appeal." Justin Wilson from The Cavalier Daily also named it "the best song on the album, one of R.E.M.'s best songs ever". He declared it as "emotionally moving" and "deeply affecting". Greg Kot from Chicago Tribune stated that it is "a ballad that would border on the maudlin if Stipe didn't sing it with such conviction". Ron Fell from the Gavin Report felt that Stipe's "powerful and emotional life-affirming message comes across very clear." He named it "a favorite track" from the album. 

A reviewer from The Gazette commented that Automatic for the People ponders frustrations of life in the "Bee Geeish" "Everybody Hurts"". In his weekly UK chart commentary, James Masterton wrote that it is "the most beautiful and moving track on the album" and "just a reflection of how the band can do no wrong at present." Pan-European magazine Music & Media described it as an "ultra melancholic ballad", noting that with string arrangements by ex Led Zeppelin bass player John Paul Jones, it is "the "Bridge Over Troubled Water" for the '90s with Michael Stipe as Simon & Garfunkel rolled into one." Alan Jones from Music Week named it Pick of the Week, declaring it as "a torchy ballad, with Stipe's fragile and waivering [sic.] vocal offset at times by discreet strings." He also complimented it as "radio-friendly". Parry Gettelman from Orlando Sentinel viewed it as "boring" and "repetitive". People Magazines reviewer found that here, the vocalist "succeeds at talking a friend out of suicide". Scripps Howard News Service wrote that the singer "has never sung better" and noted that "the unabashedly emotional" track "gives him plenty of range to display those pipes." David Cavanagh from Select said that it is "virtually beyond words." He added, "It will have non-REM maniacs in hysterics with its delicate Spector structure and childlike message ("everybody hurts, everybody cries...when you think you've had too much of this life, hang on..."). It will make everyone else cry. It really is that straightforward." Tim Southwell from Smash Hits gave the song five out of five, viewing it as "a beautiful, touching and absorbing ballad", and "bloody beautiful."

Music video
In the accompanying video for "Everybody Hurts", directed by Jake Scott and filmed along the double deck portions of I-10 near the I-35 Interchange in downtown San Antonio, Texas, in February 1993, the band is stuck in a traffic jam. It shows the people in other cars and subtitles of their thoughts appear on screen. A man standing on an overpass drops pages from a book he is reading onto the cars below, while the subtitles read "Lead me to the rock that is higher than I" and "They that sow in tears shall reap in joy", quotes from the biblical Book of Psalms 61 and 126 respectively. At the end, all the people leave their cars and walk instead; then they vanish, followed by scenes of a newscast reporting on the unusual event. Although Michael Stipe is featured prominently in the video, he remains silent until the final "Hold On, Hold On" part of the song.  The video was heavily inspired by the traffic jam in the opening dream sequence of Fellini's 8½.

Usage in media
In 1995, British emotional support listening service The Samaritans, in response to the high suicide rate but low crisis service take-up amongst young men, launched a UK press advertising campaign consisting solely of the lyrics to "Everybody Hurts" and the charity's hotline number.

The song was placed on R.E.M.'s Warner Bros. "best of" album In Time: The Best of R.E.M. 1988–2003 in 2003. It was one of four songs from Automatic for the People to make the compilation, more than from any other album. The song is included on R.E.M. Live.

U.S. President Donald Trump used the song in a Twitter video showing several Democratic politicians with sad-looking reactions towards his 2019 State of the Union Address. The former members of the band responded to this on their Twitter page, saying: "World Leader PRETEND!!! Congress, Media--ghost this faker!!! Love, R.E.M." Eventually, Twitter removed the video following a copyright complaint from Concord Music, the band's record label. Trump later re-uploaded the video, using Lee Greenwood's "God Bless the U.S.A." instead. Both versions of the video were created by a self-proclaimed Trump supporter named @CarpeDonktum. It was also used in the 2016 film Zootopia.

Track listings
All songs were written by Bill Berry, Peter Buck, Mike Mills, and Michael Stipe unless otherwise indicated. "Belong" and "Losing My Religion" were recorded live at the Capital Plaza Theater in Charleston, West Virginia, on April 28, 1992. "Orange Crush" was recorded live in Georgia, US, in November 1989.US 7-inch and CD single "Everybody Hurts" – 4:46
 "Mandolin Strum" – 3:45US 12-inch, maxi-CD, and cassette single 1 "Everybody Hurts" – 4:56
 "Mandolin Strum" – 3:45
 "Belong" (live) – 4:06
 "Orange Crush" (live) – 3:58US 12-inch, maxi-CD, and cassette single 2 "Everybody Hurts" – 4:56
 "Star Me Kitten" (demo) – 3:04
 "Losing My Religion" (live) – 4:54
 "Organ Song" – 3:23UK 7-inch and cassette single "Everybody Hurts" (edit) – 4:46
 "Pop Song '89" – 3:03UK CD1 "Everybody Hurts" (edit) – 4:46
 "New Orleans Instrumental No. 1" (long version) – 3:28
 "Mandolin Strum" – 3:45UK CD2 "Everybody Hurts" (edit) – 4:46
 "Chance" (dub) – 2:32
 "Dark Globe"  – 1:51European and Australasian CD single'''
 "Everybody Hurts" (edit) – 4:56
 "Mandolin Strum" – 3:45
 "Chance" (dub) – 2:32
 "Dark Globe"  – 1:51

Charts

Weekly charts

Year-end charts

Certifications

Helping Haiti charity single

In an attempt to raise money for victims of the 2010 Haiti earthquake, British Prime Minister Gordon Brown asked Simon Cowell to arrange a charity single. Cowell chose "Everybody Hurts". Brown agreed to waive VAT on the single, and R.E.M. agreed to waive all royalties. The release would be under the name Helping Haiti.

Proceeds from the single were to be split between The Sun'' Helping Haiti fund and the Disasters Emergency Committee. The single was released digitally on February 7, 2010, and physically on February 8, 2010.

Reportedly, the single's sales in the UK were approximately 205,000 copies in its first two days and 453,000 in its first week, making it the fastest-selling charity record of the 21st century in Britain.

This cover is also noteworthy for featuring Robbie Williams' first collaboration with Take That since Williams parted ways with the group in 1995, although neither act was present for each other's recording session.

This release also marks Jon Bon Jovi's first No. 1 appearance on the UK Singles Chart.

Artists
The song is performed by the following artists (in order of appearance):

 Leona Lewis
 Rod Stewart
 Mariah Carey
 Cheryl
 Mika
 Michael Bublé
 Joe McElderry
 Miley Cyrus
 James Blunt
 Gary Barlow
 Mark Owen
 Jon Bon Jovi
 James Morrison
 Alexandra Burke
 Jason Orange
 Susan Boyle
 JLS
 Shane Filan
 Mark Feehily
 Kylie Minogue
 Robbie Williams
 Kian Egan
 Nicky Byrne

Chart performance for Helping Haiti version
Following its February 7, 2010, release in the UK and Ireland, Helping Haiti's song entered the Irish Singles Chart on February 12 at No. 1. It entered the UK Singles Chart on February 14 at No. 1, spending two weeks at the top spot before dropping to No. 9. The single debuted on the Australian Singles Chart on February 23 at No. 28.

Music video for Helping Haiti version
A five-minute promotional short documentary was broadcast on ITV at 20.30 on February 7, 2010. The documentary includes "behind the scenes" footage of the featured performers (except for Carey, Cyrus, Bon Jovi, and Minogue) recording their vocals intercut with real-world images and footage from the earthquake aftermath, opening with a statement of what happened on January 12, 2010, and continuing with footage showing the devastation in the country and the suffering of the Haitians. The official music video, directed by Joseph Kahn, premiered on March 6, 2010. Jon Bon Jovi and Michael Bublé are the only featured artists not to appear in this video.

Track listing for Helping Haiti version
 "Everybody Hurts" – 5:24
 "Everybody Hurts" (alternative mix) – 5:35

Charts for Helping Haiti version

Weekly charts

Year-end charts

Certifications for Helping Haiti version

References

External links
Helping Haiti Facebook site
BBC on the song's history and meaning

1992 songs
1993 singles
2010 Haiti earthquake
2010 Haiti earthquake relief
2010 singles
1990s ballads
R.E.M. songs
American soft rock songs
Gospel songs
Irish Singles Chart number-one singles
MTV Video Music Award for Best Direction
Music videos directed by Jake Scott (director)
Number-one singles in Scotland
Rock ballads
Song recordings produced by Bill Berry
Song recordings produced by Michael Stipe
Song recordings produced by Mike Mills
Song recordings produced by Peter Buck
Song recordings produced by Scott Litt
Songs about suicide
Songs written by Bill Berry
Songs written by Michael Stipe
Songs written by Mike Mills
Songs written by Peter Buck
Syco Music singles
UK Singles Chart number-one singles
Warner Records singles
All-star recordings